The Order of the Sun of Peru (Spanish: Orden El Sol del Perú), formerly known as the Order of the Sun, is the highest award bestowed by the nation of Peru to commend notable civil and military merit. The award is the oldest civilian award in the Americas, first being established in 1821.

History
The Order was originally instituted on 8 October 1821 by General José de San Martín upon reaching Lima, to recognize those who had distinguished themselves in the campaign against the Spanish Royalists. The three classes of appointment to the Order were, in descending order of precedence: Founder, Meritorious and Associate.

It was discontinued four years later, after many grantees started to use the award as a nobility title, similar to the earlier Castile titles awarded by the colonial government. The Congress issued a law abolishing the Order of the Sun on May 9, 1825.

In 1921, the Order was re-established to commemorate the Centennial of Peruvian Independence.

Classes
The award consists of the following classes:

Grand Collar
Grand Cross with Diamonds
Grand Cross
Grand Officer
Commander
Officer
Knight

Notable recipients

Royalty 
 King Philip VI of Spain, invested as a Grand Cross (17 October 1991) and later promoted to Grand Collar (7 July 2015)
 Emir Tamim bin Hamad Al Thani of Qatar, Grand Collar (13 February 2014)
 King Abdullah II of Jordan, Grand Cross with Diamonds (23 May 2005)
 King Mohammed VI of Morocco, Grand Cross with Diamonds (30 November 2004)
 Queen Letizia of Spain (as Princess of Asturias), Grand Cross (5 July 2004)
 Prince Albert II of Monaco (as Hereditary Prince), Grand Cross (25 November 2003)
 King Ja'afar of Negeri Sembilan of Malaysia, Grand Cross with Diamonds (8 November 1996)
 King Rama IX of Thailand, Grand Cross with Diamonds (8 November 1996)
 Prince Michael of Kent, Grand Cross (2 November 1994)
 King Rama X of Thailand, Grand Cross (10 April 1993)
 Emperor Akihito, invested as a Grand Cross (11 May 1967) and later promoted to Grand Cross with Diamonds (13 March 1992)
 Empress Michiko, Grand Cross (13 March 1992)
 Queen Sofía of Spain, Grand Cross (17 October 1991)
 King Juan Carlos I of Spain, Grand Cross with Diamonds (8 November 1978)
 Emperor Haile Selassie, Grand Cross (1966)
 King Albert II of Belgium (as Prince of Liège), Grand Cross (23 October 1965)
 Prince Philip, Duke of Edinburgh, Grand Cross with Diamonds (13 February 1962) 
 Empress Nagako, Grand Cross (24 April 1961)
 Queen Elizabeth II of the United Kingdom, Grand Cross with Diamonds (1960)
 King Gustaf VI Adolf of Sweden
 King Edward VIII of Great Britain (as Prince of Wales), Grand Cross (1931)
 King Alfonso XIII of Spain, Grand Cross with Diamonds (1923)
 King Gustaf V of Sweden, Grand Cross with Diamonds (1923)
 King Christian X of Denmark, Grand Cross with Diamonds (1922)
 Queen Wilhelmina of the Netherlands, Grand Cross with Diamonds (1922)
 King Albert I of Belgium, Grand Cross with Diamonds (1922)
 King Victor Emmanuel III of Italy, Grand Cross with Diamonds (1922)
 King Haakon VII of Norway, Grand Cross with Diamonds (1922)
 Emperor Yoshihito of Japan, Grand Cross with Diamonds (1922) 
 King Ferdinand I of Romania, Grand Cross with Diamonds (1922)
 Grand Duchess Charlotte of Luxembourg, Grand Cross with Diamonds (1922)
 King Leopold III of Belgium (as Prince of Belgium), Grand Cross with Diamonds (1922)

Other people 

 Marcelo Rebelo de Sousa
 Ramón Miranda Ampuero
 Henry Harley "Hap" Arnold
 François Mitterrand, Grand Cross with Diamonds (9 October 1987)
 Javier Pérez de Cuéllar, Grand Cross with Diamonds (29 March 1984)
 Leonid Brezhnev, Grand Cross with Diamonds (9 June 1978)
 Carlos Andrés Pérez, Grand Cross with Diamonds (11 November 1976)
 Nicolae Ceaușescu, Grand Cross with Diamonds (14 September 1973)
 Patricia Nixon, Grand Cross with Diamonds (23 June 1971)
 Charles de Gaulle, Grand Cross with Diamonds (15 December 1969)
 G. E. Berrios
 Leonid Brezhnev
 Fernando Belaúnde Terry, Grand Cross with Diamonds (20 July 1963)
 Ernesto Burzagli
 Rosa Campuzano 
 Arturo "Zambo" Cavero
 Eduardo Frei, Grand Cross with Diamonds (13 November 1964)
 Pietro Gasparri, Grand Cross with Diamonds (1922)
 Friedrich Ebert, Grand Cross with Diamonds (1922)
 Gerardo Chavez
 Rafael Correa
 Roberto Dañino
 Alfredo Pareja Diezcanseco
 Plácido Domingo
 Juan Diego Flórez
 Francisco Estévanez Rodríguez
 Frank Freyer
 Charles de Gaulle
 Pablo Grimberg Umansky
 Herbert Hervey, 5th Marquess of Bristol
 Thor Heyerdahl
 Guillermo Hillcoat
 Daisaku Ikeda
 Cristina Fernández de Kirchner
 Alexei Kosygin
 Sergey Lavrov
 Lee Hsien Loong
 Martín Vizcarra
 Paul McCartney
 George Marshall
 Dmitry Medvedev
 José Mujica
 Pat Nixon, 1970
 Valentín Paniagua
 Chiang Kai-Shek
 George Papandreou
 Maria Reiche
 Ford O. Rogers
 Maria Rostworowski
 Manuela Sáenz
 Haile Selassie
 John F. Shafroth Jr.
 Jagatjit Singh of Kapurthala
 Yma Sumac
 Fernando de Szyszlo
 Herman Braun-Vega
 Julio C. Tello
 Valentina Tereshkova
 Danilo Türk
 Donald Tusk
 Somchai Wongsawat
 Gian Marco Zignago
 Mahathir Mohamad
 Yasuhiro Nakasone

Notes

References

 Werlich, Robert. (1965).  Orders and Decorations of All Nations: Ancient and Modern, Civil and Military. Washington, D.C.: Quaker Press.  OCLC 390804
 myetymology

 
Orders, decorations, and medals of Peru
Sun (Peru), Order of the
Awards established in 1821
1821 establishments in Peru
Awards established in 1921
1921 establishments in Peru